Virgie is a Census-designated place (CDP) located along Kentucky Route 1469 in Pike County, Kentucky, United States. Virgie's post office was established as Clintwood on April 3, 1890, with James M. Damron as postmaster. It was later renamed "Virgie" after the daughter of local resident, W.O.B. Ratliff, who was a lawyer and lumber dealer in Pikeville.

The 2020 United States census reported Virgie's population was 274.

Geography

Virgie is located at an elevation of 902 feet (275 m).

Demographics

Education
Public education in Virgie is administered by Pike County Schools, which operates Valley Elementary School and Shelby Valley High School. Formerly George F. Johnson Elementary School and Virgie Middle School (formerly Virgie High School) were the education systems in the town of Virgie, until the new integrated primary school system known as Valley Elementary.

Virgie has a lending library, a branch of the Pike County Public Library.

Notable residents

Todd May – 1982 Kentucky "Mr. Basketball". Todd May attended Virgie High School while Phillip M. Johnson was the principal there.

References

External links
Kentucky Hometown Locator: Virgie, Kentucky

Census-designated places in Pike County, Kentucky
Census-designated places in Kentucky
Coal towns in Kentucky